Aero Benin was an airline, based in Benin but registered in Germany, which carried out land and sea freight as well as passenger services. As of 8 April 2009 it is banned within the European Union and as of July, 2012, it is inactive.

Fleet
Aero Benin appear not to have had a fleet of their own, rather they code-shared with Boeing 727 aircraft (and Boeing 737 aircraft for flights between N'Djamena and Cotonou)

Destinations

Aero Benin flew the following routes:

Brazzaville-

 Cotonou
 Johannesburg
 Libreville
 N'Djamena

Cotonou-

 Libreville
 Brazzaville
 Senou

Johannesburg-

 Brazzaville

Libreville-

 Brazzaville
 Cotonou

N'Djamena-

 Cotonou

Senou-

 Cotonou

References

Defunct airlines of Benin
2002 establishments in Benin
Airlines established in 2002